The Voisin X (sometimes written as Voisin 10) was a French two-seat pusher biplane which was built in two versions, one fitted with a  Hotchkiss cannon (the LBR or X Ca.2), and the other as a conventional night bomber (the LAR or X Bn.2). Problems with the Peugeot engine in the previous Voisin VIII led to the installation of a new Renault engine of greater power and reliability, but the new aircraft was otherwise nearly identical to the VIII. Despite its obsolescence, it would make up the bulk of front line night bomber escadrilles until the end of the war.

Development
With the failure of the 1915 and 1916 bomber contests to produce any usable types to replace the Voisin V, Voisin was asked to produce an interim type pending the development of the next generation of bombers. This began with the Voisin VII which was itself an enlarged V, but was underpowered, and was soon followed by the Voisin VIII, which suffered severe reliability problems. As with the VIII, two versions were to be built, a night bomber, and an aircraft armed with a large single shot  Hotchkiss cannon. By the time the X appeared, the cannon had been found to be of little use and most of those built as LBR/Ca.2s were converted into bombers with the cannons removed. Those LBRs fitted with the cannon had the pilot in the rear seat, while in the LAR, the pilot sat in the front seat, while the rear occupant could be equipped with a light machine gun such as a Lewis. On some aircraft, the observer's gun was mounted on a ring that was inclined forward to make movement forward easier against the wind.

Like the previous Voisins going back to the Voisin III, the Voisin VIII had a steel tube structure to provide adequate strength, covered with aluminium sheet on the fuselage nacelle and doped fabric on the flying surfaces. The fuselage was square in section, with no attempt at reducing drag. The 3-bay wings had a constant chord and square tips, and the top wings were slightly greater in span than the lower wings. The cruciform tail was mounted on booms which tapered in plan view to a vertical knife edge that formed the rudder post. The all-flying rudder and elevator were aerodynamically balanced and had no fixed surfaces. Unusually for the period, and because it had no skid to drag it to a stop, it was equipped with drum brakes on the rear wheels. Like the Voisin VIII, the X was fitted with two large strut mounted teardrop fuel tanks that could be jettisoned in the event of a fire. Also, as with the VIII, the X was usually fitted with tall individual exhaust stacks projecting above the top wing. Due to the change from a V-8 to a V-12 there were additional stacks, and some examples had a muffler installed. A small additional aerodynamic counterbalance was sometimes also added at the bottom of the rudder.

Operational history

French service
The first Voisin X's entered service with VB.114 in late 1917.

Due to their poor performance relative to contemporary fighters, when opposition was anticipated, operations were carried out at night. Voisin X's were used primarily as night bombers, attacking both strategic targets such as railyards, as well as carrying out tactical missions, such as suppressing enemy troop movements. 7 Bombing Groups (Groupes de Bombardment) were formed for this purpose. Voisin X's were also used for night reconnaissance, for which 6 escadrilles were specifically formed for this role.

Beginning in July 1918, the Voisin began being supplemented by the Farman F.50 in French front-line service, with surviving aircraft being transferred to newly created second line units, however examples remained in front line service until after the armistice. Examples still equipped a number of units in 1920 but by then in the process of being wound down.

Aerochir
While the British and Americans experimented with aerial ambulances, carrying a single stretcher in a Curtiss Jenny or Airco DH.4, in France, a Voisin X was converted into a complete mobile flying hospital, the Aerochir, complete with X-ray machines and other modern equipment for a full service operating room, so as to better support the mobile battlefield conditions created by the introduction of tank warfare.

Drone/autopilot
In 1918, a Voisin X made a fully automated 100 km flight without human assistance. A pilot was carried as a backup but wasn't found to be necessary. Four Sperry gyroscopes actuated electrical servo motors which controlled the flight surfaces and the engine throttle. During the flight, it changed altitude and direction multiple times, based on a preprogrammed course set with a series of switches. Testing resumed in 1923, for intended use as an auto-pilot.

Variants

Voisin X
  Renault 12Fe
E.54 - factory designation for prototype
Voisin X Bn.2 - official designation for night bomber
Voisin X Ca.2 - official designation for cannon fighter
Voisin LAR - factory designation for X Bn.2 night bomber
Voisin LBR - factory designation for X Ca.2 armed with cannon

Voisin XI
Development with  Panhard 12Bc and minor changes to proportions but only around 10 built

Operators

 
Aéronautique Militaire
Night Reconnaissance
Escadrille VR.290 (8th Escadrille 4th RAO postwar)
Escadrille VR.291
Escadrille VR.292
Escadrille VR.293
Escadrille VR.294
Escadrille VR.295
Escadrille VR.296
Bombing
Group de Bombardment 1 (GB 1)
Escadrille V.25
Escadrille VC.110
Escadrille VB.114
Escadrille VC.116
Escadrille VB.135
Escadrille VB.136
Escadrille VB.137
Group de Bombardment 3 (GB 3)
Escadrille VB.109
Escadrille VB.113
Group de Bombardment 7 (GB 7)
Escadrille VR.118
Escadrille VR.119
Escadrille VR.121
Group de Bombardment 8 (GB 8)
Escadrille VB.109
Escadrille VC.116
Escadrille VB.125
Group de Bombardment 9 (GB 9)
Escadrille VB.125 (briefly)
Group de Bombardment 10 (GB 10)
Escadrille VB.101
Escadrille VC.116
Escadrille VB.133
Group de Bombardment 51 (GB 51)
Escadrille VB.135
Escadrille VB.136
Escadrille VB.137
scadrille VR.293
Théâtres d'Opérations Extérieurs (TOE) Overseas Theatres (mostly North Africa)
Escadrille VR.541
Escadrille VR.542
Escadrille VR.543
Escadrille VR.547
Escadrille VR.551
Escadrille VR.552
Escadrille VR.553
Escadrille VR.554
Escadrille VR.555
Escadrille VR.556
Escadrille VR.557
Escadrille VR.558
Escadrille VR.571

 four examples used by 4 Letecka Setnina and Letecke Dilny, both at Cheb postwar.

 American Expeditionary Force operated two examples as trainers in 1919.

Survivors/Aircraft on display
 Musée de l'air et de l'espace has a fuselage of a Voisin X/LBR equipped with a  Hotchkiss  cannon.

Specifications (Voisin X Bn.2/LAR)

See also

References

Citations

Bibliography

Further reading

   Official rigging manual

10
1910s French bomber aircraft
Single-engined pusher aircraft
Biplanes
Military aircraft of World War I
Aircraft first flown in 1917